Hanne Woods ( Pettersen, born 19 March 1960) is a Norwegian former world champion in curling.

International championships
Hanne Woods competed several times at the World Curling Championships, mostly with skip Dordi Nordby. She obtained a total of nine medals, including two gold medals. In 1990 winning against Scotland in the world championship final, and in the 1991 final winning against Canada.

She received nine medals in the European Curling Championships, including gold medals in 1990 and 1999.

Olympics
She participated at the demonstration event at the 1988 Winter Olympics, finishing third, and again at the demonstration event at the 1992 Winter Olympics, finishing second.

See also
 List of World Curling Women's Champions

References

External links

 

1960 births
Living people
Norwegian female curlers
World curling champions
Curlers at the 2002 Winter Olympics
Curlers at the 1992 Winter Olympics
Curlers at the 1988 Winter Olympics
Olympic curlers of Norway
Continental Cup of Curling participants
European curling champions
Sportspeople from Oslo